John Coxon may refer to:

 John Coxon (pirate)
 John Coxon (footballer) (1922–1998), English footballer
 John Coxon (musician), member of English band Spring Heel Jack